Roy Thomas (1949–2004) was one of the most influential 20th-century Anishinaabe painters in Canada, and was famous for paintings of colourful totemic animals. Like Norval Morrisseau, he became well known when Indigenous art gained mainstream popularity in the late 1960s and early 1970s.

Thomas and his family moved to the Long Lake 58 Reserve in northern Ontario in the late 1950s. Like many other First Nations youth of his generation, he was forced to attend a religious residential school.

His distinctive style can be seen in the art of younger First Nations artists, many of whom he had mentored.

Death
Thomas died of cancer in 2004.

References

External links
 Official site
 Artist profile on Bearclaw Gallery

1949 births
2004 deaths
Artists from Ontario
First Nations painters
Ojibwe people
20th-century First Nations painters